The 1995 Western Kentucky Hilltoppers football team represented Western Kentucky University as an independent during the 1995 NCAA Division I-AA football season Led by seventh-year head coach Jack Harbaugh, the Hilltoppers compiled a record of 2–8. The team's captains were Stephon Benford, Daryl Houston, and Dan McGrath.

Schedule

References

Western Kentucky
Western Kentucky Hilltoppers football seasons
Western Kentucky Hilltoppers football